Hala Mohammad al-Nasser (born 1964) is the current Minister of Housing and Construction for Syria, serving since 2011.

Early life, education and career
Al-Nasser was born in the Raqqa Governorate in 1964. She earned a degree in civil engineering from the University of Aleppo in 1991. 
She became assistant director of technical services in Raqqa in 1992. On 26 December 2009 she was appointed Chief Engineer of Syria.

She is a member of the Branch Association of Engineers, a member of the General Federation of Women's Council, and a member of the General Conference of the Association of Engineers. She became a member of the Raqqa Branch leadership of the Arab Socialist Ba'ath Party in 2002, and a member of the Committee Central to the Ba'ath Party in 2005.

Personal life
Al-Nasser is married and has three children.

See also
Cabinet of Syria

References

Minister of Housing and Construction Hala Mohammad al-Nasser, SANA
Biography of the new Syrian government 2011 - the names and lives of government ministers, Syria FM, 17 April 2011

External links
Ministry of Housing and Construction official government website

1964 births
Living people
University of Aleppo alumni
Government ministers of Syria